Gregory Crewdson: Brief Encounters is a 2012 American documentary film directed, produced, and shot by Ben Shapiro. It premiered March 10, 2012 at the South by Southwest Film Festival and is distributed by Zeitgeist Films.

Cast
 Gregory Crewdson as himself
 Laurie Simmons as herself
 Melissa Harris as herself
 Rick Moody as himself
 Russell Banks as himself

Critical response

The New York Times reviewed the film as a “Critics Pick”.

Los Angeles Times Film Critic Betsy Sharkey wrote “in the excellent new documentary "Gregory Crewdson: Brief Encounters,"filmmaker Ben Shapiro gives us fly-on-the-wall access over a 10-year period to an acclaimed artist.”

Ronnie Scheib wrote in Variety: “A perfect canvas for Crewdson’s epic creations, “Brief Encounters” reps a must-see for art lovers.”

Slant Magazine said “Brief Encounters is great entertainment”

Gregory Crewdson: Brief Encounters won the Maysles Brothers Award for Best Documentary Film at the Denver Film Festival. The jury that presented the award included this statement: “A film that at first seems like a simple portrait of an artist, but actually touches on deep and complex issues facing suburban America today through provocative photographs.” It also won the Best Documentary Award at the Savannah Film Festival.

Release
Gregory Crewdson: Brief Encounters premiered at South by Southwest, and opened at Film Forum in New York on October 31, 2012, and on November 16 2012 at the Film Society of Lincoln Center, then into limited theatrical release.
It has shown widely at film festivals in the US and internationally including SXSW, LACMA Film Independent, Big Sky, New Orleans, Newport, FIFA, Oslo.

Music
The original score was composed by Dana Kaproff. The soundtrack was released by Perseverance Records on December 5, 2012.
The closing credit music is a performance of Crewdson’s teenage band’s song “Let Me Take Your Foto” by the group Little Silver.

References

External links
 
 
 

American documentary films
Documentary films about photographers
2012 films
2010s English-language films
2010s American films